Abdulaziz Abdulrahman Almusallam is an Emirati novelist and writer. He is the chairman of Sharjah Institute for Heritage.

Almusallam has worked to promote the Emirati culture and heritage. The National newspaper described Almusallam as the "fairy tale man" and praised his involvement in the heritage week by going to schools and telling Emirati traditional folktales and "jinn tales".

References

Living people
People from the Emirate of Sharjah
Emirati art collectors
Year of birth missing (living people)